Biroc or BIROC may refer to:
 Joseph Biroc (1903–1996), American cinematographer
 British Isles Regional Organising Committee (BIROC) of the Industrial Workers of the World (IWW)